Miguel de Miguel (born 17 April 1975 in Nerja, Spain), is a Spanish actor.

Filmography

Films

Television

References

External links 

21st-century Spanish male actors
1975 births
Living people
Spanish male television actors
Spanish male telenovela actors